The Walker County Messenger is a weekly broadsheet newspaper published in LaFayette, Georgia, distributed throughout the greater Walker county area of northwest Georgia. It was the first newspaper to be published in LaFayette, Walker County, and was recently purchased by Times-Journal Inc., a Marietta, Georgia-based company which owns over five Georgia newspapers. The current president and editor of the newspaper is Don Stilwell.

History

Beginnings 
First published on July 27, 1877, the Walker County Messenger was the first newspaper to be established in LaFayette, Walker County, Georgia. Captain Augustus McHan and son E.A. McHan served as the primary editors of the original newspaper, making E.A. McHan, aged 16, the youngest southern editor at the time. Yearly subscriptions to the Messenger, six-columns and four-pages at the time, began at one dollar. The paper also served the Chattooga, Catoosa, and Dade counties until newspapers were created within the counties.

Change in ownership 
The McHans sold the paper to Nathan Campbell Napier in 1880, but E.A. McHan continued to work as the editor-in-chief, before eventually retiring. Napier continued to run the newspaper for 21 years before relinquishing ownership to his son in 1902. E.P. Hall Junior bought the newspaper in 1915, retaining ownership until 1973 when it was bought by Boone Publishing Co. On September 22, 1988, the paper was bought by News Publishing Co., before eventually being bought by the present owner, Times-Journal Inc.

Digitization 
In December 2017, over 16,000 pages of the Walker County Messenger were added to the Georgia Historic Newspapers (GHN) website. The funding for the digitization was provided by Georgia HomePLACE, a project of the Digital Library of Georgia (DLG) dedicated to encouraging public library participation in other DLG programs.

Sister publications 

 Rome News-Tribune
 Polk Standard Journal
 Calhoun Times
 Catoosa County News

Accomplishments 

 In 2003, the newspaper won five awards presented by the Georgia Press Association in their 'Better Newspaper' contest. This included a 3rd place award for community service and a second place award for headlines. The photography and sports section also received praise in the contest.

See also 

 List of newspapers in Georgia

References

External links 

 https://dlg.usg.edu
 https://gahistoricnewspapers.galileo.usg.edu
 https://georgialibraries.org/homeplace/

Newspapers published in Georgia (U.S. state)
Walker County, Georgia